Grays United F.C. was an English football club based in Grays, Essex. The club played at the Recreation Ground.

The club joined Division Two of the Southern League in 1899. In 1900–01 they finished second and qualified for the promotion-relegation test matches.  However, after the game against Division One club Watford ended 0–0, Grays refused to play extra time, and were subsequently not promoted. The following season they finished runners-up again, and faced a test-match for a second successive season, this time against Brentford. The match, played at the Memorial Grounds, was drawn 1–1, but the club again refused to play extra time, and were not promoted.

The club withdrew from the Southern League at the end of the 1905–06 season and merged with Grays Juniors to form Grays Athletic.

Former players
1. Players that have played/managed in the Football League or any foreign equivalent to this level (i.e. fully professional league).
2. Players with full international caps.
3. Players that hold a club record or have captained the club.
 Ralph McElhaney

References

Defunct football clubs in England
Defunct football clubs in Essex
Sport in Thurrock
Southern Football League clubs
Grays, Essex
Association football clubs disestablished in 1906
Association football clubs established in the 19th century
South Essex League